The Special Interrogation Group (SIG) was a unit of the British Army during World War II, formed largely of German-speaking Jewish volunteers from Mandatory Palestine. Disguised as soldiers of the German Afrika Korps, members of the SIG undertook commando and sabotage operations against Axis forces during the Western Desert Campaign.

Formation
The inspiration for the SIG belonged to Captain Herbert Cecil Buck, MC of the 3rd Bn., 1st Punjab Regiment and later the Scots Guards, an Oxford scholar and German linguist. He had been captured in January 1942, but had soon managed to break free and had then escaped back across Libya to Egypt, partly using German uniforms and vehicles. He was surprised by the ease of his deception and felt that, with greater planning and preparation, the concept could be used more offensively, to assist raiding parties attack key targets behind enemy lines. His plan was approved and, in March 1942, he was appointed the commander of this new unit, the SIG.

In March 1942, Col. Terence Airey, Military Intelligence Research at the War Office in London wrote that "a Special German Group as a sub-unit of M[iddle] E[ast] Commando... with the cover name 'Special Interrogation Group', to be used for infiltration behind the German lines in the Western Desert, under 8th Army... the strength of the Special Group would be approximately that of a platoon... The personnel are fluent German linguists... mainly Palestinian (Jews) of German origin. Many of them have had war experience with No. 51 Commando..."

Some personnel was also recruited directly from the Palmach, Haganah and the Irgun. Other recruits came from the Free Czechoslovak Forces, the French Foreign Legion and German-speaking Jewish troops. The SIG was a part of D Squadron, First Special Service Regiment. Its strength varied between 20 and 38, according to various sources.

Training
According to ex-SIG member Maurice "Tiffen" Monju Tiefenbrunner, their first training base was located near Suez. The SIG were trained in desert navigation, unarmed combat, handling of German weapons and explosives. They were given fake German identities and were taught German marching songs and current German slang. For their missions, they were supplied with German pay books, cigarettes, chocolates and love letters from fictitious sweethearts in Germany. Walter Essner and Herbert Brueckner, two non-Jewish Germans, had been conscripted from a POW camp to train the SIG. Before the war, both had been members of the French Foreign Legion who had been captured in November 1941 serving in the 361st Infantry Regiment of the Afrika Korps and were subsequently recruited by the British Combined Services Detailed Interrogation Centre (CSDIC) as double agents.

Operations and betrayal
The SIG drove captured German vehicles behind German lines near Bardia, set up roadblocks and carried out acts of sabotage. Dressed as Feldgendarmerie (German military police), they stopped and questioned German transports, gathering important military intelligence. On 3 June 1942 the SIG was assigned its first assault operation. They were to assist the Special Air Service, led by Lt. Col. David Stirling in destroying Luftwaffe airfields which were threatening the Malta convoys. These airfields were located 100 miles west of Tobruk at Derna and Martuba in the Italian colony of Libya. During the raid, on the night of 13/14 June, Herbert Brueckner managed to run away by faking an engine problem of the truck he was driving and betrayed the Derna party, nearly all of whom were killed or captured. Essner, closely guarded by Tiefenbrunner throughout the raid, was handed over to the Military Police and later shot while trying to escape.

Disbandment
On the night of 13/14 September 1942, the SIG participated in Operation Agreement, the raid on Tobruk. Its objective was to destroy supplies in the port. The SIG were to play the role of German guards transporting three truckloads of British POWs to a camp at Tobruk. The assault failed and the British forces lost three ships and several hundred soldiers and Marines. Surviving SIG members were transferred to the Pioneer Corps.

Tiefenbrunner account of SIG
In January 1999, Maurice (Monju) Tiefenbrunner, a surviving member of SIG, recorded his life story in an unpublished autobiography booklet called "A Long Journey Home". On pages 37–41, he provides information on SIG unit formation and operations. After the SIG was disbanded, Tiefenbrunner was caught by the Italians and sent to a POW camp in Italy. He was moved to a POW camp in Nazi German territory, where he met Vic Crockford. They were released in early 1945.

Partial list of SIG members

 Capt. Herbert Cecil Buck, MC, 3/1 Punjabis [service no.: IA. 1117]. Killed in an aircraft crash just after the war: 22 November 1945, aged 28
 Maurice "Tiffen" (Monju) Tiefenbrunner (a veteran of No. 51 (Palestine) Commando and later a member of the SAS) - MiD
 Ariyeh Shai
 Dov Cohen, a veteran of No. 51 Commando and, after the war, a member of the Jewish Irgun organisation, also known - from its initials - as (EtZeL), where he was known as 'Shimshon'. Killed at the age of 32 in the aftermath of the Acre Prison Break in 1947
 Bernard Lowenthal
 Lt.Herbert Delmonte-Nietto-Hollander, attached from the largely Jewish Tower Hamlets Rifles, part of the London Regiment; British born of German father. Attended St.Pauls School, London. Army officers Welterweight Boxing champion 1937/8. Later Staff officer at Ranby P.O.W camp Notts and subsequently interrogator at Belsen Concentration camp of Joseph Kramer.
 Israel Carmi later, a Captain in the Jewish Brigade and an officer of the Israeli Tzahal
 Karl Kahane served in the regular German army for 20 years, had an Iron Cross from World War I, a Town Clerk in Austria until forced to flee after the Anschluss
 Dolph Zentner a veteran of No. 51 (Palestine) Commando
 Philip [Shraga-Iser] Kogel a veteran of No. 51 (Palestine) Commando
 Walter Essner German POW - non-Jewish traitor
 Herbert Brueckner German POW - as above
 Charlie 'Chunky' Hillman/aka Steiner (Austrian Nazi Baiter) - MC and Bar

Gottlieb - believed kia

Haas, Peter - believed kia

Rosenzweig

Weizmann/Opprower

Goldstein/Wilenski

Berg/Rohr

Popular culture
The 1967 film Tobruk was about a raid of the SIG and the Long Range Desert Group (LRDG) on a German Afrika Korps fuel depot in Tobruk, starring Rock Hudson and George Peppard. The film depicting elements of Operation Agreement shows the raid to be successful. In the 2022 BBC TV series SAS: Rogue Heroes, the failure of the Derna raid and its betrayal by Brueckner are depicted in one of the episodes.

See also
 Jewish Brigade
 Jewish partisans
 Jewish resistance under Nazi rule

Notes

References

Bibliography

 Silvio Tasselli, Special Interrogation Group "S.I.G." in Nord Africa, "Storia & Battaglie", N.5, Novembre 2000

Further reading
 Martin Gilbert, The Jews in the Twentieth Century. An Illustrated History (Schocken Books, 2001)  pp. 218–220
 Damien Lewis, SAS Ghost Patrol: The Ultra-Secret Unit That Posed As Nazi Stormtroopers, (Hachette UK, 2017) , 9781786483133.
 James Owen, Commando (Little, Brown, 2012) .
 John Sadler, Operation Agreement: Jewish Commandos and the Raid on Tobruk (Osprey Publishing, 2016) ISBN 978-1472814883.
 Martin Sugarman, 'The SIG: behind enemy lines with Jewish Commandos' in Jewish Historical Studies Vol. 35 (1996–1998) pp. 287–307. Also chapter in 'Fighting Back' by Martin Sugarman , Valentine Mitchell, 2017

External links
 Combat and Resistance: Jewish Soldiers in the Allied Armies on the Yad Vashem website
  silviotasselli.com

Special forces of the United Kingdom
Jewish resistance during the Holocaust
Jewish military units and formations
Commandos (United Kingdom)
Military units and formations of Mandatory Palestine in World War II